Muhammad Ali Koroy (born 18 September 2001) is an Indonesian professional footballer who plays as a winger or forward for Liga 1 club Persikabo 1973.

Club career

Persikabo 1973
He was signed for Persikabo 1973 to play in Liga 1 in the 2022 season. Koroy made his league debut on 27 August 2022 in a match against Madura United at the Gelora Bangkalan Stadium, Bangkalan.

Career statistics

Club

Notes

Honours

Club
Persipa Pati
 Liga 3 Central Java: 2021

References

External links
 Ali Koroy at Soccerway
 Ali Koroy at Liga Indonesia

2001 births
Living people
Sportspeople from North Maluku
Indonesian footballers
Persipa Pati players
Persikabo 1973 players
Liga 1 (Indonesia) players
Association football forwards